Gniazdo (English: The Nest) is a 1974 Polish historical film about Mieszko I, the founder of the first independent Polish state, circa 960 AD. The film was written by Aleksander Ścibor-Rylski and directed by Jan Rybkowski.

Cast and characters
 Wojciech Pszoniak as Mieszko I
 Marek Bargiełowski as Czcibor, Mieszko's brother
 Wanda Neumann as Dubrawa
 Franciszek Pieczka as Mrokota
 Bolesław Płotnicki as Siemomysł, Mieszko's father
 Tadeusz Białoszczyński as Gero
 Janusz Bylczyński as Odo I, Margrave of the Saxon Ostmark
 Czesław Wołłejko as Otto I, Holy Roman Emperor

References

External links
 

Films set in the 10th century
Films set in Poland
1974 films
Polish biographical films
Polish historical films
1970s historical films
Films directed by Jan Rybkowski
1970s biographical films